Kirkhope may refer to:

Places
Kirkhope Tower, Scotland
Kirkhope, Scottish Borders, in the Scottish Borders

People with the surname
Grant Kirkhope, video game music composer
Tony Kirkhope, film director
Timothy Kirkhope, British politician